Swahid Smriti Mahavidyalaya, established in 1987, is a general degree college situated at Belsar in Nalbari district, Assam. This college is affiliated with the Gauhati University. This college offers different courses in arts.

References

External links

Universities and colleges in Assam
Colleges affiliated to Gauhati University
Educational institutions established in 1987
1987 establishments in Assam